Kereta api may refer to:

 Kereta Api Indonesia (KAI), the state railway operator in Indonesia
 Keretapi Tanah Melayu (KTM), a major railway operator in Peninsular Malaysia